is a Japanese professional footballer who plays as a defensive midfielder for  club Kashima Antlers.

Career statistics

Club
.

References

External links

Profile at Kashima Antlers

1997 births
Living people
Japanese footballers
Association football midfielders
Chuo University alumni
J2 League players
J1 League players
Ventforet Kofu players
Kashima Antlers players